King v. Smith, 392 U.S. 309 (1968), was a decision in which the Supreme Court of the United States held that Aid to Families with Dependent Children (AFDC) could not be withheld because of the presence of a "substitute father" who visited a family on weekends. The issue before the US Supreme Court involved how the states could determine how to implement a federal program.  The court used the term "co-operative federalism."

Background
Mrs. Sylvester Smith was a Dallas County, Alabama resident who had four children, without a biological father providing support. The father of three of her children had died and the father of her fourth child was not in the picture.  Thus, she qualified for AFDC.  She was, however, having an affair with a Mr. Williams.  Mr. Williams had nine children of his own.  Williams, who visited on weekends, was counted as a "substitute father", thus disqualifying the family for aid according to Alabama Law.

Decision
The Court held that the term "father" did not include substitute fathers because Williams was under no obligation to support Smith's children.

External links 
 

United States Supreme Court cases
1968 in United States case law
American Civil Liberties Union litigation
Fatherhood
Federal assistance in the United States
Legal history of Alabama
United States equal protection case law
Dallas County, Alabama
United States Supreme Court cases of the Warren Court